Birch Hills is a town in Saskatchewan.

Birch Hills may also refer to:
 Birch Hills County, a municipal district in Alberta
 Birch Hills No. 460, Saskatchewan, a rural municipality